Qsaibeh, (النبطية), El Kossaybeh, also known as El Qsaïbé (in Arabic: القصيبة) is a village in southern Lebanon on the northern side of the Litani's river.

History
In  the 1596 tax records, it was named as a village,  Qusayba, in the Ottoman nahiya (subdistrict) of  Sagif, part of Safad Sanjak, with a population of  26 households and 7 bachelors, all Muslim. The villagers paid a fixed  tax-rate of 25 %  on  agricultural products, such as wheat, barley, olive trees, cotton, goats and beehives, in addition to  "occasional revenues"; a total of 4,300  akçe.

In 1875, Victor Guérin found here a village with 300 inhabitants, mostly Metualis and some Greek Orthodox. The mosque was possibly a former church.

References

Bibliography

External links
Qsaibeh (Nabatiyeh), Localiban

Populated places in Nabatieh District